Consolacion Rustia Alaras (born 1941) is a professor and former chairperson of the Department of English and Comparative Literature (DECL) at the University of the Philippines Diliman. A nominee to the University presidency twice, she holds a Ph.D. in Philippine Studies from UP Diliman.

She has written and researched extensively on God-centered governance and English for national purpose.

Academic career
Alaras had taken her A.B. in English and M.A. in comparative literature at the University of the Philippines Diliman before working on a doctorate degree. Her reputation was propelled by her research works on Pamathalaan or God-centered governance which commenced from her Ph.D. dissertation.

She retired as Professor 12, the highest regular academic rank in the University and remains teaching as a Professorial Lecturer at the Department of English and Comparative Literature (DECL) in UP Diliman.

References

Living people
1941 births
Academic staff of the University of the Philippines
University of the Philippines Diliman alumni
Filipino women academics